Lars-Olof Sandberg (born 1940) is a Swedish former footballer who played as a forward. Sandberg was part of the Djurgården Swedish champions' team of 1964. Sandberg made 34 Allsvenskan appearances for Djurgården and scored 6 goals.

Honours
Djurgårdens IF
 Allsvenskan: 1964

References

Living people
1940 births
Association football forwards
Swedish footballers
Allsvenskan players
Djurgårdens IF Fotboll players